Jánovce is a village and municipality in Poprad District in the Prešov Region of northern Slovakia.

Geography
The municipality lies at an altitude of 591 metres and covers an area of 9.677 km². It has a population of about 1180 people.

History
In historical records the village was first mentioned in 1312.

Economy and infrastructure
The village has table tennis, football and aerobic clubs. Cultural sightseers will enjoy the Late Baroque church with a Bothic altar.

Notable personalities
Mikuláš of Levoča, painter from 15th century, one of the major Gothic painters in Slovakia.
Hadbavný Štefan Romuald, author of Latin-Slovak dictionary

See also
 List of municipalities and towns in Slovakia

References

Genealogical resources

The records for genealogical research are available at the state archive "Statny Archiv in Levoca, Slovakia"

 Roman Catholic church records (births/marriages/deaths): 1758-1897 (parish B)

External links
https://web.archive.org/web/20160804040718/http://janovce.e-obce.sk/
Surnames of living people in Janovce

Villages and municipalities in Poprad District